İzzet Paşa Mosque is a mosque in Elazığ, Turkey

It is on Gazi Paşa boulevard  of Elazığ.
The commissioner of the mosque was Hacı Ahmet İzzet Pasha, the governor of Elazığ during the Ottoman Empire era. It was completed in 1866. 
It was an abode structure and it could barely withstand aging in a century. In 1967 it was demolished by a İzvak, a foundation established to
renew the mosque. In 1972 the mosque was rebuilt and was opened to service.
The other dimensions of the mosque are 44 x 28.5 m2 (144 x 94 ft2). It also has two porticos with dimensions 8 x 28.5 m2 and 4 x 27.15 m2. The diameter of its dome is  
It has two  minarets. The mosque also houses 115 markets in the ground floor built to provide revenue to sustain the mosque.

See also
 List of mosques in Turkey

References

Buildings and structures in Elazığ Province
1866 establishments in the Ottoman Empire
1972 establishments in Turkey
Mosques in Turkey
Mosque buildings with domes
Mosques completed in 1972
20th-century religious buildings and structures in Turkey